Telestes is a genus of cyprinid fish. It was formerly usually included in Leuciscus.

Species
There are currently 14 recognized species in this genus:
 Telestes beoticus (Stephanidis, 1939) (Paskóviza)
 Telestes croaticus (Steindachner, 1866) (Croatian pijor)
 Telestes dabar Bogutskaya, Zupančič, Bogut & Naseka, 2012
 Telestes fontinalis (M. S. Karaman (sr), 1972) (Spring pijor)
 Telestes karsticus Marčić, Buj, Duplić, Ćaleta, Mustafić, Zanella, Zupančič & Mrakovčić, 2011
 Telestes metohiensis (Steindachner, 1901)
 Telestes miloradi Bogutskaya, Zupančič, Bogut & Naseka, 2012
 Telestes montenigrinus (Vuković, 1963)
 Telestes muticellus (Bonaparte, 1837) (Vairone)
 Telestes pleurobipunctatus (Stephanidis, 1939)
 Telestes polylepis Steindachner, 1866
 Telestes souffia (A. Risso, 1827) (Souffia, Western vairone)
 Telestes turskyi (Heckel, 1843)
 †?Telestes ukliva (Heckel, 1843)

References 

 
Taxa named by Charles Lucien Bonaparte